Karaosmanlı is a village in the Kargı District of Çorum Province in Turkey. Its population is 33 (2022).

References

Villages in Kargı District